Events in Italy in 2003:

Incumbents
 President: Carlo Azeglio Ciampi
 Prime Minister: Silvio Berlusconi

Events

 January 31: Miss Universo Italia 2003
 February 12: The newspaper Europa is founded.
 February 17: Abu Omar is abducted by the CIA and SISMI.
 June 17: Wind Jet starts operating.
 July 31: Sky Italia is founded by Rupert Murdoch.
 September 28: 2003 Italy blackout

Elections

 Italian regional elections, 2003
 Italian referendum, 2003
 Friuli-Venezia Giulia regional election, 2003
 Trentino-Alto Adige/Südtirol provincial elections, 2003
 Valdostan regional election, 2003

Sport

 Serie A 2002–03
 Serie B 2002–03
 2003 Coppa Italia Final
 2002 Supercoppa Italiana
 2003 UEFA Champions League Final
 2003 Italian Grand Prix
 2003 San Marino Grand Prix
 2003 Italian motorcycle Grand Prix
 2003 Italy rugby union tour
 2003 Women's Hockey Champions Challenge
 2003 UCI Cyclo-cross World Championships
 2003 European Curling Championships
 FIVB World Grand Prix 2003
 2003 Giro d'Italia
 2003 Women's World Ice Hockey Championships
 2003 Milan–San Remo
 2003 World Rowing Championships
 2003 ISSF World Cup
 2003 Winter Universiade
 2003 World Interuniversity Games

Film

 60th Venice International Film Festival

Music

 List of number-one hits of 2003 (Italy)

Television

 2003 in Italian television

Deaths
 4 March - Fedora Barbieri, operatic mezzo-soprano (born 1920)
 7 July – Mario Pedini, politician (born 1918)
 28 October– Sally Baldwin, social sciences professor (born 1940 in Scotland)

References

 
Italy
Years of the 21st century in Italy
2000s in Italy
Italy